Agent X-77 Orders to Kill (also known as Baraka for Secret Service) is a 1966 French-Spanish-Italian spy film directed by Maurice Cloche and starring Gérard Barray and Sylva Koscina. Silvio Siano is credited as co-director in the Italian version of the film (credited as "Edgar Lawson") due to co-production obligations. It is loosely based on the novel Silence clinique by Eddy Ghilain.

Cast  
 Gérard Barray as  Serge Vadile, Agent X-77 (Agent X 13 in France)
Sylva Koscina as  Mania 
  Agnès Spaak as Ingrid
José Suárez as Franck
Yvette Lebon as Elvire
Renato Baldini as Dr. Lupescu
Gemma Cuervo as Solange
Gérard Tichy as Dr. Reichmann
Luis Induni as M. Klein 
Aldo Bufi Landi  	
Giacomo Furia

Release
Agent X-77 Orders to Kill was released in France in 1966 as Baraka sur X 13.

References

External links

1966 films
1960s spy thriller films
French spy thriller films
Italian spy thriller films
Spanish spy thriller films
Films directed by Maurice Cloche
1960s French-language films
1960s Italian films
1960s Spanish films
1960s French films